Henry James Pye (20 February 1745 – 11 August 1813) was an English poet, and Poet Laureate from 1790 until his death. His appointment owed nothing to poetic achievement, and was probably a reward for political favours. Pye was merely a competent prose writer, who fancied himself as a poet, earning the derisive label of poetaster.

Life
Pye was born in London, the son of Henry Pye of Faringdon House in Berkshire, and his wife, Mary James. He was the nephew of Admiral Thomas Pye. He was educated at Magdalen College, Oxford. His father died in 1766, leaving him a legacy of debt amounting to £50,000, and the burning of the family home further increased his difficulties.

In 1784 he was elected Member of Parliament for Berkshire. He was obliged to sell the paternal estate, and, retiring from Parliament in 1790, became a police magistrate for Westminster. Although he had no command of language and was destitute of poetic feeling, his ambition was to obtain recognition as a poet, and he published many volumes of verse.

Of all he wrote, his prose Summary of the Duties of a Justice of the Peace out of Sessions (1808) is most worthy of record. He was made poet laureate in 1790, perhaps as a reward for his faithful support of William Pitt the Younger in the House of Commons. The appointment was looked on as ridiculous, and his birthday odes were a continual source of contempt. The 20th-century British historian Lord Blake called Pye "the worst Poet Laureate in English history with the possible exception of Alfred Austin". Indeed, Pye's successor, Robert Southey, wrote in 1814: "I have been rhyming as doggedly and dully as if my name had been Henry James Pye." He was the first poet laureate to receive a fixed salary of £270 instead of the historic tierce of Canary wine. After his death, Pye remained one of the unfortunate few who have been classified as a "poetaster".

As a prose writer, Pye was far from contemptible. He had a fancy for commentaries and summaries. His "Commentary on Shakespeare's commentators", and that appended to his translation of the Poetics, contain some noteworthy matter. A man, who, born in 1745, could write "Sir Charles Grandison is a much more unnatural character than Caliban," may have been a poetaster but was certainly not a fool.

He died in Pinner, Middlesex on 11 August 1813. He is buried in Pinner's parish church of St John the Baptist.

Pye married twice. He had two daughters by his first wife. He married secondly in 1801 Martha Corbett, by whom he had a son, Henry John Pye, who in 1833 inherited the Clifton Hall, Staffordshire estate of a distant cousin and who was High Sheriff of Staffordshire in 1840.

Works

Prose
- Summary of the Duties of a Justice of the Peace out of Sessions (1808)
- The Democrat (1795)
- The Aristocrat (1799)
Poetry
- Poems on Various Subjects (1787), first substantial collection of Pye's verse
- Adelaide: a Tragedy in Five Acts (1800)
- Alfred (1801)
Translations
- Aristotle's Poetics (1792)

Notes

References

A Genealogical and Heraldic History of the Commoners of Great Britain and Ireland John Burke (1835) pp 350–2 Google Books

External links

1744 births
1813 deaths
19th-century English poets
British Poets Laureate
People from Faringdon
Writers from London
Members of the Parliament of Great Britain for Berkshire
Alumni of Magdalen College, Oxford
18th-century English writers
18th-century English male writers
19th-century English writers
18th-century English poets
British MPs 1784–1790
English male poets
19th-century English male writers